Mirimordella gracilicruralis is a fossil species of beetles in the family Mordellidae, the only species in the genus Mirimordella.

References

†
†
Prehistoric beetle genera
Cretaceous insects of Asia
Fossil taxa described in 2007